Baptism (from ) is a form of ritual purification—a characteristic of many religions throughout time and geography. In Christianity, it is a Christian sacrament of initiation and adoption, almost invariably with the use of water. It may be performed by sprinkling or pouring water on the head, or by immersing in water either partially or completely, traditionally three times, once for each person of the Trinity. The synoptic gospels recount that John the Baptist baptised Jesus. Baptism is considered a sacrament in most churches, and as an ordinance in others. Baptism according to the Trinitarian formula, which is done in most mainstream Christian denominations, is seen as being a basis for Christian ecumenism, the concept of unity amongst Christians. Baptism is also called christening, although some reserve the word "christening" for the baptism of infants. In certain Christian denominations, such as the Lutheran Churches, baptism is the door to church membership, with candidates taking baptismal vows. It has also given its name to the Baptist churches and denominations.

Martyrdom was identified early in church history as "baptism by blood", enabling the salvation of martyrs who had not been baptized by water. Later, the Catholic Church identified a baptism of desire, by which those preparing for baptism who die before actually receiving the sacrament are considered saved. Some Christian thinking regards baptism as necessary for salvation, but some writers, such as Huldrych Zwingli (1484–1531), have denied its necessity.

Quakers and the Salvation Army do not practice water baptism at all. Among denominations that practice water baptism, differences occur in the manner and mode of baptizing and in the understanding of the significance of the rite. Most Christians baptize using the trinitarian formula "in the name of the Father, and of the Son, and of the Holy Spirit" (following the Great Commission), but Oneness Pentecostals baptize using Jesus' name only. Much more than half of all Christians baptize infants; many others, such as Baptist Churches, regard only believer's baptism as true baptism. In certain denominations, such as the Eastern and Oriental Orthodox Churches, the individual being baptized receives a cross necklace that is worn for the rest of their life, inspired by the Sixth Ecumenical Council (Synod) of Constantinople.

Mandaeans undergo repeated baptism for purification instead of initiation. They consider John the Baptist to be their greatest prophet and name all rivers yardena after the River Jordan.

The term "baptism" has also been used metaphorically to refer to any ceremony, trial, or experience by which a person is initiated, purified, or given a name.

Etymology

The English word baptism is derived indirectly through Latin from the neuter Greek concept noun báptisma (Greek , "washing, dipping"), which is a neologism in the New Testament derived from the masculine Greek noun baptismós, a term for ritual washing in Greek language texts of Hellenistic Judaism during the Second Temple period, such as the Septuagint. Both of these nouns are derived from the verb baptízō ("I wash" transitive verb), which is used in Jewish texts for ritual washing, and in the New Testament both for ritual washing and also for the apparently new rite of báptisma.

The Greek verb báptō, "dip", from which the verb baptízō is derived, is in turn hypothetically traced to a reconstructed Indo-European root *gʷabh-, "dip".

History

The practice of baptism emerged from Jewish ritualistic practices during the Second Temple Period, out of which figures such as John the Baptist emerged. For example, various texts in the Dead Sea Scrolls (DSS) corpus at Qumran describe ritual practices involving washing, bathing, sprinkling, and immersing. One example of such a text is a DSS known as the Rule of the Community, which says "And by the compliance of his soul with all the laws of God his flesh is cleansed by being sprinkled with cleansing waters and being made holy with the waters of repentance." The Mandaeans, who are followers of John the Baptist, practice frequent full immersion baptism (masbuta) as a ritual of purification. According to Mandaean sources, they left the Jordan Valley in the 1st century AD. John the Baptist, who is considered a forerunner to Christianity, used baptism as the central sacrament of his messianic movement. The apostle Paul distinguished between the baptism of John, ("baptism of repentance") and baptism in the name of Jesus, and it is questionable whether Christian baptism was in some way linked with that of John. However, according to Mark 1:8, John seems to connect his water baptism as a type of the true, ultimate baptism of Jesus, which is by the Spirit. Christians consider Jesus to have instituted the sacrament of baptism.

Though some form of immersion was likely the most common method of baptism in the early church, many of the writings from the ancient church appeared to view this mode of baptism as inconsequential. The Didache 7.1–3 (AD 60–150) allowed for affusion practices in situations where immersion was not practical. Likewise, Tertullian (AD 196–212) allowed for varying approaches to baptism even if those practices did not conform to biblical or traditional mandates (cf. De corona militis 3; De baptismo 17). Finally, Cyprian (ca. AD 256) explicitly stated that the amount of water was inconsequential and defended immersion, affusion, and aspersion practices (Epistle 75.12). As a result, there was no uniform or consistent mode of baptism in the ancient church prior to the fourth century.

By the third and fourth centuries, baptism involved catechetical instruction as well as chrismation, exorcisms, laying on of hands, and recitation of a creed.

In the early middle ages infant baptism became common and the rite was significantly simplified and increasingly emphasized. In Western Europe Affusion became the normal mode of baptism between the twelfth and fourteenth centuries, though immersion was still practiced into the sixteenth. In the medieval period, some radical Christians rejected the practice of baptism as a sacrament. Sects such as the Tondrakians, Cathars, Arnoldists, Petrobrusians, Henricans, Brethren of the Free Spirit and the Lollards were regarded as heretics by the Catholic Church. In the sixteenth century, Martin Luther retained baptism as a sacrament, but Swiss reformer Huldrych Zwingli considered baptism and the Lord's supper to be symbolic. Anabaptists denied the validity of the practice of infant baptism, and rebaptized converts.

Mode and manner

Baptism is practiced in several different ways. Aspersion is the sprinkling of water on the head, and affusion is the pouring of water over the head. Traditionally, a person is sprinkled, poured, or immersed three times for each person of the Holy Trinity, with this ancient Christian practice called trine baptism or triune baptism. The Didache specifies:

Aspersion or sprinkling best describes cleansing aspect of baptism as indicated in Psalm 51:7, "Cleanse me with hyssop, and I will be clean; wash me, and I will be whiter than snow".

Affusion or pouring best describes anointing, which points to the pouring of the Holy Spirit unto the believing person as indicated in many of the Old Testament types of anointing kings, prophets, and priests with oil.

Immersion or submersion best describes burial and resurrection of the believer in Christ.

The word "immersion" is derived from late Latin immersio, a noun derived from the verb immergere (in – "into" + mergere "dip"). In relation to baptism, some use it to refer to any form of dipping, whether the body is put completely under water or is only partly dipped in water; they thus speak of immersion as being either total or partial. Others, of the Anabaptist belief, use "immersion" to mean exclusively plunging someone entirely under the surface of the water. The term "immersion" is also used of a form of baptism in which water is poured over someone standing in water, without submersion of the person. On these three meanings of the word "immersion", see Immersion baptism.

When "immersion" is used in opposition to "submersion", it indicates the form of baptism in which the candidate stands or kneels in water and water is poured over the upper part of the body. Immersion in this sense has been employed in West and East since at least the 2nd century and is the form in which baptism is generally depicted in early Christian art. In the West, this method of baptism began to be replaced by affusion baptism from around the 8th century, but it continues in use in Eastern Christianity.

The word submersion comes from the late Latin (sub- "under, below" + mergere "plunge, dip") and is also sometimes called "complete immersion". It is the form of baptism in which the water completely covers the candidate's body. Submersion is practiced in the Orthodox and several other Eastern Churches. In the Latin Church of the Catholic Church, baptism by submersion is used in the Ambrosian Rite and is one of the methods provided in the Roman Rite of the baptism of infants. It is seen as obligatory among some groups that have arisen since the Protestant Reformation, such as Baptists.

Meaning of the Greek verb baptizein
The Greek-English Lexicon of Liddell and Scott gives the primary meaning of the verb baptízein, from which the English verb "baptize" is derived, as "dip, plunge", and gives examples of plunging a sword into a throat or an embryo and for drawing wine by dipping a cup in the bowl; for New Testament usage it gives two meanings: "baptize", with which it associates the Septuagint mention of Naaman dipping himself in the Jordan River, and "perform ablutions", as in Luke 11:38.

Although the Greek verb baptízein does not exclusively mean dip, plunge or immerse (it is used with literal and figurative meanings such as "sink", "disable", "overwhelm", "go under", "overborne", "draw from a bowl"), lexical sources typically cite this as a meaning of the word in both the Septuagint and the New Testament.

"While it is true that the basic root meaning of the Greek words for baptize and baptism is immerse/immersion, it is not true that the words can simply be reduced to this meaning, as can be seen from Mark 10:38–39, Luke 12:50, Matthew 3:11 Luke 3:16 and Corinthians10:2."

Two passages in the Gospels indicate that the verb baptízein did not always indicate submersion. The first is Luke 11:38, which tells how a Pharisee, at whose house Jesus ate, "was astonished to see that he did not first wash (ἐβαπτίσθη, aorist passive of βαπτίζω—literally, "was baptized") before dinner". Jesus' omission of this action is similar to that of his disciples: "Then came to Jesus scribes and Pharisees, which were of Jerusalem, saying, Why do thy disciples transgress the tradition of the elders? for they wash not their hands when they eat bread". The other Gospel passage pointed to is: "The Pharisees...do not eat unless they wash (the ordinary word for washing) their hands thoroughly, observing the tradition of the elders; and when they come from the market place, they do not eat unless they wash themselves (literally, "baptize themselves"—βαπτίσωνται, passive or middle voice of βαπτίζω)".

Scholars of various denominations claim that these two passages show that invited guests, or people returning from market, would not be expected to immerse themselves ("baptize themselves") totally in water but only to practise the partial immersion of dipping their hands in water or to pour water over them, as is the only form admitted by present Jewish custom. In the second of the two passages, it is actually the hands that are specifically identified as "washed", not the entire person, for whom the verb used is baptízomai, literally "be baptized", "be immersed", a fact obscured by English versions that use "wash" as a translation of both verbs. Zodhiates concludes that the washing of the hands was done by immersing them. The Liddell–Scott–Jones Greek-English Lexicon (1996) cites the other passage (Luke 11:38) as an instance of the use of the verb baptízein to mean "perform ablutions", not "submerge". References to the cleaning of vessels which use βαπτίζω also refer to immersion.

As already mentioned, the lexicographical work of Zodhiates says that, in the second of these two cases, the verb baptízein indicates that, after coming from the market, the Pharisees washed their hands by immersing them in collected water. Balz & Schneider understand the meaning of βαπτίζω, used in place of ῥαντίσωνται (sprinkle), to be the same as βάπτω, to dip or immerse, a verb used of the partial dipping of a morsel held in the hand into wine or of a finger into spilled blood.

A possible additional use of the verb baptízein to relate to ritual washing is suggested by Peter Leithart (2007) who suggests that Paul's phrase "Else what shall they do who are baptized for the dead?" relates to Jewish ritual washing. In Jewish Greek the verb baptízein "baptized" has a wider reference than just "baptism" and in Jewish context primarily applies to the masculine noun baptismós "ritual washing"

The verb baptízein occurs four times in the Septuagint in the context of ritual washing, baptismós; Judith cleansing herself from menstrual impurity, Naaman washing seven times to be cleansed from leprosy, etc.

Additionally, in the New Testament only, the verb baptízein can also relate to the neuter noun báptisma "baptism" which is a neologism unknown in the Septuagint and other pre-Christian Jewish texts.

This broadness in the meaning of baptízein is reflected in English Bibles rendering "wash", where Jewish ritual washing is meant: for example Mark 7:4 states that the Pharisees "except they wash (Greek "baptize"), they do not eat", and "baptize" where báptisma, the new Christian rite, is intended.

Derived nouns
Two nouns derived from the verb baptízō (βαπτίζω) appear in the New Testament: the masculine noun baptismós (βαπτισμός) and the neuter noun báptisma (βάπτισμα):
 baptismós (βαπτισμός) refers in Mark 7:4 to a water-rite for the purpose of purification, washing, cleansing, of dishes; in the same verse and in Hebrews 9:10 to Levitical cleansings of vessels or of the body; and in Hebrews 6:2 perhaps also to baptism, though there it may possibly refer to washing an inanimate object. According to Spiros Zodhiates when referring merely to the cleansing of utensils baptismós (βαπτισμός) is equated with rhantismós (ῥαντισμός, "sprinkling"), found only in Hebrews 12:24 and Peter 1:2, a noun used to indicate the symbolic cleansing by the Old Testament priest.
 báptisma (βάπτισμα), which is a neologism appearing to originate in the New Testament, and probably should not be confused with the earlier Jewish concept of baptismós (βαπτισμός), Later this is found only in writings by Christians. In the New Testament, it appears at least 21 times:
 13 times with regard to the rite practised by John the Baptist;
 3 times with reference to the specific Christian rite (4 times if account is taken of its use in some manuscripts of Colossians 2:12, where, however, it is most likely to have been changed from the original baptismós than vice versa);
 5 times in a metaphorical sense.
 Manuscript variation: In Colossians, some manuscripts have neuter noun báptisma (βάπτισμα), but some have masculine noun baptismós (βαπτισμός), and this is the reading given in modern critical editions of the New Testament. If this reading is correct, then this is the only New Testament instance in which baptismós (βαπτισμός) is clearly used of Christian baptism, rather than of a generic washing, unless the opinion of some is correct that Hebrews 6:2 may also refer to Christian baptism.
 The feminine noun baptisis, along with the masculine noun baptismós both occur in Josephus' Antiquities (J. AJ 18.5.2) relating to the murder of John the Baptist by Herod. This feminine form is not used elsewhere by Josephus, nor in the New Testament.

Apparel
Until the Middle Ages, most baptisms were performed with the candidates naked—as is evidenced by most of the early portrayals of baptism (some of which are shown in this article), and the early Church Fathers and other Christian writers. Deaconesses helped female candidates for reasons of modesty.

Typical of these is Cyril of Jerusalem who wrote "On the Mysteries of Baptism" in the 4th century (c. 350 AD):

The symbolism is threefold:

1. Baptism is considered to be a form of rebirth—"by water and the Spirit"—the nakedness of baptism (the second birth) paralleled the condition of one's original birth. For example, John Chrysostom calls the baptism "λοχείαν", i.e., giving birth, and "new way of creation...from water and Spirit" ("to John" speech 25,2), and later elaborates:

 

2. The removal of clothing represented the "image of putting off the old man with his deeds" (as per Cyril, above), so the stripping of the body before for baptism represented taking off the trappings of sinful self, so that the "new man", which is given by Jesus, can be put on.

3. As Cyril again asserts above, as Adam and Eve in scripture were naked, innocent and unashamed in the Garden of Eden, nakedness during baptism was seen as a renewal of that innocence and state of original sinlessness. Other parallels can also be drawn, such as between the exposed condition of Christ during His crucifixion, and the crucifixion of the "old man" of the repentant sinner in preparation for baptism.

Changing customs and concerns regarding modesty probably contributed to the practice of permitting or requiring the baptismal candidate to either retain their undergarments (as in many Renaissance paintings of baptism such as those by da Vinci, Tintoretto, Van Scorel, Masaccio, de Wit and others) or to wear, as is almost universally the practice today, baptismal robes. These robes are most often white, symbolizing purity. Some groups today allow any suitable clothes to be worn, such as trousers and a T-shirt—practical considerations include how easily the clothes will dry (denim is discouraged), and whether they will become see-through when wet.

In certain Christian denominations, the individual being baptized receives a cross necklace that is worn for the rest of their life as a "sign of the triumph of Christ over death and our belonging to Christ" (though it is replaced with a new cross pendant if lost or broken). This practice of baptized Christians wearing a cross necklace at all times is derived from Canon 73 and Canon 82 of the Sixth Ecumenical Council (Synod) of Constantinople, which declared:

Meaning and effects

There are differences in views about the effect of baptism for a Christian. Catholics, Orthodox, and most mainline Protestant groups assert baptism is a requirement for salvation and a sacrament, and speak of "baptismal regeneration". Its importance is related to their interpretation of the meaning of the "Mystical Body of Christ" as found in the New Testament. This view is shared by the Catholic and Eastern Orthodox denominations, and by churches formed early during the Protestant Reformation such as Lutheran and Anglican. For example, Martin Luther said:

The Churches of Christ," Jehovah's Witnesses, Christadelphians, and the Church of Jesus Christ of Latter-day Saints espouse baptism as necessary for salvation.

For Roman Catholics, baptism by water is a sacrament of initiation into the life of the children of God (Catechism of the Catholic Church, 1212–13). It configures the person to Christ (CCC 1272), and obliges the Christian to share in the church's apostolic and missionary activity (CCC 1270). The Catholic holds that there are three types of baptism by which one can be saved: sacramental baptism (with water), baptism of desire (explicit or implicit desire to be part of the church founded by Jesus Christ), and baptism of blood (martyrdom). In his encyclical Mystici corporis Christi of June 29, 1943, Pope Pius XII spoke of baptism and profession of the true faith as what makes members of the one true church, which is the body of Jesus Christ himself, as God the Holy Spirit has taught through the Apostle Paul:

By contrast, Anabaptist and Evangelical Protestants recognize baptism as an outward sign of an inward reality following on an individual believer's experience of forgiving grace. Reformed and Methodist Protestants maintain a link between baptism and regeneration, but insist that it is not automatic or mechanical, and that regeneration may occur at a different time than baptism. Churches of Christ consistently teach that in baptism a believer surrenders his life in faith and obedience to God, and that God "by the merits of Christ's blood, cleanses one from sin and truly changes the state of the person from an alien to a citizen of God's kingdom. Baptism is not a human work; it is the place where God does the work that only God can do." Thus, they see baptism as a passive act of faith rather than a meritorious work; it "is a confession that a person has nothing to offer God".

Christian traditions

The liturgy of baptism for Catholics, Eastern Orthodox, Lutheran, Anglican, and Methodist makes clear reference to baptism as not only a symbolic burial and resurrection, but an actual supernatural transformation, one that draws parallels to the experience of Noah and the passage of the Israelites through the Red Sea divided by Moses. Thus, baptism is literally and symbolically not only cleansing, but also dying and rising again with Christ. Catholics believe baptism is necessary to cleanse the taint of original sin, and so commonly baptise infants.

The Eastern Churches (Eastern Orthodox Church and Oriental Orthodoxy) also baptize infants on the basis of texts, such as Matthew 19:14, which are interpreted as supporting full church membership for children. In these denominations, baptism is immediately followed by Chrismation and Communion at the next Divine Liturgy, regardless of age. Orthodox likewise believe that baptism removes what they call the ancestral sin of Adam. Anglicans believe that baptism is also the entry into the church. Most Methodists and Anglicans agree that it also cleanses the taint of what in the West is called original sin, in the East ancestral sin.

Eastern Orthodox Christians usually insist on complete threefold immersion as both a symbol of death and rebirth into Christ, and as a washing away of sin. Latin Church Catholics generally baptize by affusion (pouring); Eastern Catholics usually by submersion, or at least partial immersion. However, submersion is gaining in popularity within the Latin Catholic Church. In newer church sanctuaries, the baptismal font may be designed to expressly allow for baptism by immersion. Anglicans baptize by immersion or affusion.

According to evidence which can be traced back to about the year 200, sponsors or godparents are present at baptism and vow to uphold the Christian education and life of the baptized.

Baptists argue that the Greek word  originally meant "to immerse". They interpret some Biblical passages concerning baptism as requiring submersion of the body in water. They also state that only submersion reflects the symbolic significance of being "buried" and "raised" with Christ. Baptist Churches baptize in the name of the Trinity—the Father, the Son, and the Holy Spirit. However, they do not believe that baptism is necessary for salvation; but rather that it is an act of Christian obedience.

Some "Full Gospel" charismatic churches such as Oneness Pentecostals baptize only in the name of Jesus Christ, citing Peter's preaching baptism in the name of Jesus as their authority.

Ecumenical statements
In 1982 the World Council of Churches published the ecumenical paper Baptism, Eucharist and Ministry. The preface of the document states:

A 1997 document, Becoming a Christian: The Ecumenical Implications of Our Common Baptism, gave the views of a commission of experts brought together under the aegis of the World Council of Churches. It states:

Those who heard, who were baptized and entered the community's life, were already made witnesses of and partakers in the promises of God for the last days: the forgiveness of sins through baptism in the name of Jesus and the outpouring of the Holy Ghost on all flesh. Similarly, in what may well be a baptismal pattern, 1 Peter testifies that proclamation of the resurrection of Jesus Christ and teaching about new life lead to purification and new birth. This, in turn, is followed by eating and drinking God's food, by participation in the life of the community—the royal priesthood, the new temple, the people of God—and by further moral formation. At the beginning of 1 Peter the writer sets this baptism in the context of obedience to Christ and sanctification by the Spirit. So baptism into Christ is seen as baptism into the Spirit. In the fourth gospel Jesus' discourse with Nicodemus indicates that birth by water and Spirit becomes the gracious means of entry into the place where God rules.

Validity considerations by some churches

The vast majority of Christian denominations admit the theological idea that baptism is a sacrament, that has actual spiritual, holy and salvific effects. Certain key criteria must be complied with for it to be valid, i.e., to actually have those effects. If these key criteria are met, violation of some rules regarding baptism, such as varying the authorized rite for the ceremony, renders the baptism illicit (contrary to the church's laws) but still valid.

One of the criteria for validity is use of the correct form of words. The Roman Catholic Church teaches that the use of the verb "to baptize" is essential. Catholics of the Latin Church, Anglicans and Methodists use the form "I baptize you in the name of...". The passive voice is used by Eastern Orthodox and Byzantine Catholics, the form being "The Servant of God is baptized in the name of...".

Use of the Trinitarian formula "in the name of the Father, and of the Son, and of the Holy Spirit" is also considered essential; thus these churches do not accept as valid baptisms of non-Trinitarian churches such as Oneness Pentecostals.

Another essential condition is use of water. A baptism in which some liquid that would not usually be called water, such as wine, milk, soup or fruit juice was used would not be considered valid.

Another requirement is that the celebrant intends to perform baptism. This requirement entails merely the intention "to do what the Church does", not necessarily to have Christian faith, since it is not the person baptizing, but the Holy Spirit working through the sacrament, who produces the effects of the sacrament. Doubt about the faith of the baptizer is thus no ground for doubt about the validity of the baptism.

Some conditions expressly do not affect validity—for example, whether submersion, immersion, affusion (pouring) or aspersion (sprinkling) is used. However, if water is sprinkled, there is a danger that the water may not touch the skin of the unbaptized. As has been stated, "it is not sufficient for the water to merely touch the candidate; it must also flow, otherwise there would seem to be no real ablution. At best, such a baptism would be considered doubtful. If the water touches only the hair, the sacrament has probably been validly conferred, though in practice the safer course must be followed. If only the clothes of the person have received the aspersion, the baptism is undoubtedly void." For many communions, validity is not affected if a single submersion or pouring is performed rather than a triple, but in Orthodoxy this is controversial.

According to the Catholic Church, baptism imparts an indelible "seal" upon the soul of the baptized and therefore a person who has already been baptized cannot be validly baptized again. This teaching was affirmed against the Donatists who practiced rebaptism. The grace received in baptism is believed to operate ex opere operato and is therefore considered valid even if administered in heretical or schismatic groups.

Recognition by other denominations
The Catholic, Lutheran, Anglican, Presbyterian and Methodist Churches accept baptism performed by other denominations within this group as valid, subject to certain conditions, including the use of the Trinitarian formula. It is only possible to be baptized once, thus people with valid baptisms from other denominations may not be baptized again upon conversion or transfer. For Roman Catholics, this is affirmed in the Canon Law 864, in which it is written that "[e]very person not yet baptized and only such a person is capable of baptism." Such people are accepted upon making a profession of faith and, if they have not yet validly received the sacrament/rite of confirmation or chrismation, by being confirmed. Specifically, "Methodist theologians argued that since God never abrogated a covenant made and sealed with proper intentionality, rebaptism was never an option, unless the original baptism had been defective by not having been made in the name of the Trinity." In some cases it can be difficult to decide if the original baptism was in fact valid; if there is doubt, conditional baptism is administered, with a formula on the lines of "If you are not yet baptized, I baptize you...."

The Catholic Church ordinarily recognizes as valid the baptisms of Christians of the Eastern Orthodox, Churches of Christ, Congregationalist, Anglican, Lutheran, Old Catholic, Polish National Catholic, Reformed, Baptist, Brethren, Methodist, Presbyterian, Waldensian, and United Protestant denominations; Christians of these traditions are received into the Catholic Church through the sacrament of Confirmation. Some individuals of the Mennonite, Pentecostal and Adventist traditions who wish to be received into the Catholic Church may be required to receive a conditional baptism due to concerns about the validity of the sacraments in those traditions. On the other hand, the Catholic Church has explicitly denied the validity of the baptism conferred in The Church of Jesus Christ of Latter-day Saints.

The Reformed Churches recognize as valid baptisms administered in the Catholic Church, among other churches using the Trinitarian formula.

Practice in the Eastern Orthodox Church for converts from other communions is not uniform. However, generally baptisms performed in the name of the Holy Trinity are accepted by the Orthodox Christian Church; Christians of the Oriental Orthodox, Roman Catholic, Lutheran, Old Catholic, Moravian, Anglican, Methodist, Reformed, Presbyterian, Brethren, Assemblies of God, or Baptist traditions can be received into the Eastern Orthodox Church through the sacrament of Chrismation. If a convert has not received the sacrament (mysterion) of baptism, he or she must be baptised in the name of the Holy Trinity before they may enter into communion with the Orthodox Church. If he has been baptized in another Christian confession (other than Orthodox Christianity) his previous baptism is considered retroactively filled with grace by chrismation or, in rare circumstances, confession of faith alone as long as the baptism was done in the name of the Holy Trinity (Father, Son and Holy Spirit). The exact procedure is dependent on local canons and is the subject of some controversy.

Oriental Orthodox Churches recognise the validity of baptisms performed within the Eastern Orthodox Communion. Some also recognise baptisms performed by Catholic Churches. Any supposed baptism not performed using the Trinitarian formula is considered invalid.

In the eyes of the Catholic Church, all Orthodox Churches, Anglican and Lutheran Churches, the baptism conferred by The Church of Jesus Christ of Latter-day Saints is invalid. An article published together with the official declaration to that effect gave reasons for that judgment, summed up in the following words: "The Baptism of the Catholic Church and that of the Church of Jesus Christ of Latter-day Saints differ essentially, both for what concerns faith in the Father, Son and Holy Spirit, in whose name Baptism is conferred, and for what concerns the relationship to Christ who instituted it."

The Church of Jesus Christ of Latter-day Saints stresses that baptism must be administered by one having proper authority; consequently, the church does not recognize the baptism of any other church as effective.

Jehovah's Witnesses do not recognise any other baptism occurring after 1914 as valid, as they believe that they are now the one true church of Christ, and that the rest of "Christendom" is false religion.

Officiator

There is debate among Christian churches as to who can administer baptism. Some claim that the examples given in the New Testament only show apostles and deacons administering baptism. Ancient Christian churches interpret this as indicating that baptism should be performed by the clergy except in extremis, i.e., when the one being baptized is in immediate danger of death. Then anyone may baptize, provided, in the view of the Eastern Orthodox Church, the person who does the baptizing is a member of that church, or, in the view of the Catholic Church, that the person, even if not baptized, intends to do what the church does in administering the rite. Many Protestant churches see no specific prohibition in the biblical examples and permit any believer to baptize another.

In the Roman Catholic Church, canon law for the Latin Church lays down that the ordinary minister of baptism is a bishop, priest or deacon, but its administration is one of the functions "especially entrusted to the parish priest". If the person to be baptized is at least fourteen years old, that person's baptism is to be referred to the bishop, so that he can decide whether to confer the baptism himself. If no ordinary minister is available, a catechist or some other person whom the local ordinary has appointed for this purpose may licitly do the baptism; indeed in a case of necessity any person (irrespective of that person's religion) who has the requisite intention may confer the baptism By "a case of necessity" is meant imminent danger of death because of either illness or an external threat. "The requisite intention" is, at the minimum level, the intention "to do what the Church does" through the rite of baptism.

In the Eastern Catholic Churches, a deacon is not considered an ordinary minister. Administration of the sacrament is reserved to the Parish Priest or to another priest to whom he or the local hierarch grants permission, a permission that can be presumed if in accordance with canon law. However, "in case of necessity, baptism can be administered by a deacon or, in his absence or if he is impeded, by another cleric, a member of an institute of consecrated life, or by any other Christian faithful; even by the mother or father, if another person is not available who knows how to baptize."

The discipline of the Eastern Orthodox Church, Oriental Orthodoxy and the Assyrian Church of the East is similar to that of the Eastern Catholic Churches. They require the baptizer, even in cases of necessity, to be of their own faith, on the grounds that a person cannot convey what he himself does not possess, in this case membership in the church. The Latin Catholic Church does not insist on this condition, considering that the effect of the sacrament, such as membership of the church, is not produced by the person who baptizes, but by the Holy Spirit. For the Orthodox, while Baptism in extremis may be administered by a deacon or any lay-person, if the newly baptized person survives, a priest must still perform the other prayers of the Rite of Baptism, and administer the Mystery of Chrismation.

The discipline of Anglicanism and Lutheranism is similar to that of the Latin Catholic Church. For Methodists and many other Protestant denominations, too, the ordinary minister of baptism is a duly ordained or appointed minister of religion.

Newer movements of Protestant Evangelical churches, particularly non-denominational, allow laypeople to baptize.

In The Church of Jesus Christ of Latter-day Saints, only a man who has been ordained to the Aaronic priesthood holding the priesthood office of priest or higher office in the Melchizedek priesthood may administer baptism.

A Jehovah's Witnesses baptism is performed by a "dedicated male" adherent. Only in extraordinary circumstances would a "dedicated" baptizer be unbaptized (see section Jehovah's Witnesses).

Practitioners

Protestantism

Anabaptist
Early Anabaptists were given that name because they re-baptized persons who they felt had not been properly baptized, as they did not recognize infant baptism.

The traditional form of Anabaptist baptism was pouring, the form commonly used in Western Christianity in the early 16th century when they emerged. Pouring continues to be normative in Mennonite, Amish and Hutterite traditions of Anabaptist Christianity. The Mennonite Brethren Church, Schwarzenau Brethren and River Brethren denominations of Anabaptist Christianity practice immersion. The Schwarzenau church immerses in the forward position three times, for each person of the Holy Trinity and because "the Bible says Jesus bowed his head (letting it fall forward) and died. Baptism represents a dying of the old, sinful self." Today all modes of baptism (such as pouring and immersion) can be found among Anabaptists.

Conservative Mennonite Anabaptists count baptism to be one of the seven ordinances. In Anabaptist theology, baptism is a part of the process of salvation. For Anabaptists, "believer's baptism consists of three parts, the Spirit, the water, and the blood—these three witnesses on earth." According to Anabaptist theology: (1) In believer's baptism, the Holy Spirit witnesses the candidate entering into a covenant with God. (2) God, in believer's baptism, "grants a baptized believer the water of baptism as a sign of His covenant with them—that such a one indicates and publicly confesses that he wants to live in true obedience towards God and fellow believers with a blameless life." (3) Integral to believer's baptism is the candidate's mission to witness to the world even unto martyrdom, echoing Jesus' words that "they would be baptized with His baptism, witnessing to the world when their blood was spilt."

Baptist
For the majority of Baptists, Christian baptism is the immersion of a believer in water in the name of the Father, the Son, and the Holy Spirit. Baptism does not accomplish anything in itself, but is an outward personal sign that the person's sins have already been washed away by the blood of Christ's cross.

For a new convert the general practice is that baptism also allows the person to be a registered member of the local Baptist congregation (though some churches have adopted "new members classes" as a mandatory step for congregational membership).

Regarding rebaptism the general rules are:
 baptisms by other than immersion are not recognized as valid and therefore rebaptism by immersion is required; and
 baptisms by immersion in other denominations may be considered valid if performed after the person having professed faith in Jesus Christ (though among the more conservative groups such as Independent Baptists, rebaptism may be required by the local congregation if performed in a non-Baptist church – and, in extreme cases, even if performed within a Baptist church that wasn't an Independent Baptist congregation)

For newborns, there is a ceremony called child dedication.

Tennessee antebellum Methodist circuit rider and newspaper publisher William G. Brownlow stated within his 1856 book The Great Iron Wheel Examined; or, Its False Spokes Extracted, and an Exhibition of Elder Graves, Its Builder that the immersion baptism practiced within the Baptist churches as found within the United States did not extend in a "regular line of succession...from John the Baptist - but from old Zeke Holliman and his true yoke-fellow, Mr. [Roger] Williams" as during 1639 Holliman and Williams first immersion baptized each other and then immersion baptized the ten other members of the first Baptist church in British America at Providence, Rhode Island.

Churches of Christ
Baptism in Churches of Christ is performed only by full bodily immersion, based on the Koine Greek verb baptizo which means to dip, immerse, submerge or plunge. Submersion is seen as more closely conforming to the death, burial and resurrection of Jesus than other modes of baptism. Churches of Christ argue that historically immersion was the mode used in the 1st century, and that pouring and sprinkling later emerged as secondary modes when immersion was not possible. Over time these secondary modes came to replace immersion. Only those mentally capable of belief and repentance are baptized (i.e., infant baptism is not practiced because the New Testament has no precedent for it).

Churches of Christ have historically had the most conservative position on baptism among the various branches of the Restoration Movement, understanding baptism by immersion to be a necessary part of conversion. The most significant disagreements concerned the extent to which a correct understanding of the role of baptism is necessary for its validity. David Lipscomb insisted that if a believer was baptized out of a desire to obey God, the baptism was valid, even if the individual did not fully understand the role baptism plays in salvation. Austin McGary contended that to be valid, the convert must also understand that baptism is for the forgiveness of sins. McGary's view became the prevailing one in the early 20th century, but the approach advocated by Lipscomb never totally disappeared. As such, the general practice among churches of Christ is to require rebaptism by immersion of converts, even those who were previously baptized by immersion in other churches.

More recently, the rise of the International Churches of Christ has caused some to reexamine the issue.

Churches of Christ consistently teach that in baptism a believer surrenders his life in faith and obedience to God, and that God "by the merits of Christ's blood, cleanses one from sin and truly changes the state of the person from an alien to a citizen of God's kingdom. Baptism is not a human work; it is the place where God does the work that only God can do." Baptism is a passive act of faith rather than a meritorious work; it "is a confession that a person has nothing to offer God." While Churches of Christ do not describe baptism as a "sacrament", their view of it can legitimately be described as "sacramental." They see the power of baptism coming from God, who chose to use baptism as a vehicle, rather than from the water or the act itself, and understand baptism to be an integral part of the conversion process, rather than just a symbol of conversion. A recent trend is to emphasize the transformational aspect of baptism: instead of describing it as just a legal requirement or sign of something that happened in the past, it is seen as "the event that places the believer 'into Christ' where God does the ongoing work of transformation." There is a minority that downplays the importance of baptism to avoid sectarianism, but the broader trend is to "reexamine the richness of the biblical teaching of baptism and to reinforce its central and essential place in Christianity."

Because of the belief that baptism is a necessary part of salvation, some Baptists hold that the Churches of Christ endorse the doctrine of baptismal regeneration. However, members of the Churches of Christ reject this, arguing that since faith and repentance are necessary, and that the cleansing of sins is by the blood of Christ through the grace of God, baptism is not an inherently redeeming ritual. Rather, their inclination is to point to the biblical passage in which Peter, analogizing baptism to Noah's flood, posits that "likewise baptism doth also now save us" but parenthetically clarifies that baptism is "not the putting away of the filth of the flesh but the response of a good conscience toward God" (1 Peter 3:21). One author from the churches of Christ describes the relationship between faith and baptism this way, "Faith is the reason why a person is a child of God; baptism is the time at which one is incorporated into Christ and so becomes a child of God" (italics are in the source). Baptism is understood as a confessional expression of faith and repentance, rather than a "work" that earns salvation.

Lutheranism

In Lutheran Christianity, baptism is a sacrament that regenerates the soul. Upon one's baptism, one receives the Holy Spirit and becomes a part of the church.

Methodism

The Methodist Articles of Religion, with regard to baptism, teach:

While baptism imparts grace, Methodists teach that a personal acceptance of Jesus Christ (the first work of grace) is essential to one's salvation; during the second work of grace, entire sanctification, a believer is purified of original sin and made holy.

In the Methodist Churches, baptism is a sacrament of initiation into the visible Church. Wesleyan covenant theology further teaches that baptism is a sign and a seal of the covenant of grace:

Methodists recognize three modes of baptism as being valid—"immersion, sprinkling, or pouring" in the name of the Holy Trinity.

Moravianism
The Moravian Church teaches that baptism is a sign and a seal, recognizing three modes of baptism as being valid: immersion, aspersion, and affusion.

Reformed Protestantism

In Reformed baptismal theology, baptism is seen as primarily God's offer of union with Christ and all his benefits to the baptized. This offer is believed to be intact even when it is not received in faith by the person baptized. Reformed theologians believe the Holy Spirit brings into effect the promises signified in baptism. Baptism is held by almost the entire Reformed tradition to effect regeneration, even in infants who are incapable of faith, by effecting faith which would come to fruition later. Baptism also initiates one into the visible church and the covenant of grace. Baptism is seen as a replacement of circumcision, which is considered the rite of initiation into the covenant of grace in the Old Testament.

Reformed Christians believe that immersion is not necessary for baptism to be properly performed, but that pouring or sprinkling are acceptable. Only ordained ministers are permitted to administer baptism in Reformed churches, with no allowance for emergency baptism, though baptisms performed by non-ministers are generally considered valid. Reformed churches, while rejecting the baptismal ceremonies of the Roman Catholic church, accept the validity of baptisms performed with them and do not rebaptize.

United Protestants
In United Protestant Churches, such as the United Church of Canada, Church of North India, Church of Pakistan, Church of South India, Protestant Church in the Netherlands, Uniting Church in Australia and United Church of Christ in Japan, baptism is a sacrament.

Catholicism

In Catholic teaching, baptism is stated to be "necessary for salvation by actual reception or at least by desire". Catholic discipline requires the baptism ceremony to be performed by deacons, priests, or bishops, but in an emergency such as danger of death, anyone can licitly baptize. This teaching is based on the Gospel according to John which says that Jesus proclaimed: "Truly, truly, I say to you, unless one is born of water and the Spirit, he cannot enter into the Kingdom of God." It dates back to the teachings and practices of 1st-century Christians, and the connection between salvation and baptism was not, on the whole, an item of major dispute until Huldrych Zwingli denied the necessity of baptism, which he saw as merely a sign granting admission to the Christian community. The Catechism of the Catholic Church states that "Baptism is necessary for salvation for those to whom the Gospel has been proclaimed and who have had the possibility of asking for this sacrament." The Council of Trent also states in the Decree Concerning Justification from session six that baptism is necessary for salvation. A person who knowingly, willfully and unrepentantly rejects baptism has no hope of salvation. However, if knowledge is absent, "those also can attain to salvation who through no fault of their own do not know the Gospel of Christ or His Church, yet sincerely seek God and moved by grace strive by their deeds to do His will as it is known to them through the dictates of conscience."

The Catechism of the Catholic Church also states: "Since Baptism signifies liberation from sin and from its instigator the devil, one or more exorcisms are pronounced over the candidate". In the Roman Rite of the baptism of a child, the wording of the prayer of exorcism is: "Almighty and ever-living God, you sent your only Son into the world to cast out the power of Satan, spirit of evil, to rescue man from the kingdom of darkness and bring him into the splendour of your kingdom of light. We pray for this child: set him (her) free from original sin, make him (her) a temple of your glory, and send your Holy Spirit to dwell with him (her). Through Christ our Lord."

In the Catholic Church by baptism all sins are forgiven, original sin and all personal sins. Baptism not only purifies from all sins, but also makes the neophyte "a new creature," an adopted son of God, who has become a "partaker of the divine nature," member of Christ and co-heir with him, and a temple of the Holy Spirit. Given once for all, baptism cannot be repeated: just as a man can be born only once, so he is baptized only once. For this reason the holy Fathers added to the Nicene Creed the words We acknowledge one Baptism. Sanctifying grace, the grace of justification, given by God by baptism, erases the original sin and personal actual sins.
The power of Baptism consists in cleansing a man from all his sins as regards both guild and punishment, for which reason no penance is imposed on those who receive Baptism, no matter how great their sins may have been. And if they were to die immediately after Baptism, they would rise at once to eternal life. 

In the Western Catholic Church a valid baptism requires, according to Canon 758 of the 1917 Code of Canon Law, the baptizer to pronounce the formula "I baptize you in the name of the Father and of the Son and of the Holy Spirit" while putting the baptized in contact with water. The contact may be immersion, "affusion" (pouring), or "aspersion" (sprinkling). The formula requires "name" to be singular, emphasising the monotheism of the Trinity. It is claimed that Pope Stephen I, Ambrose and Pope Nicholas I declared that baptisms in the name of "Jesus" only as well as in the name of "Father, Son and Holy Spirit" were valid. The correct interpretation of their words is disputed. Current canonical law requires the Trinitarian formula and water for validity. The formula requires "I baptize" rather than "we baptize", as clarified by a responsum of June 24, 2020. In 2022 the Diocese of Phoenix accepted the resignation of a parish priest whose use of "we baptize" had invalidated "thousands of baptisms over more than 20 years". Note that in the Byzantine Rite the formla is in the passive voice, "The servant of God N. is baptized in the Name of the Father, and of the Son, and of the Holy Spirit."

Offspring of practicing Catholic parents are typically baptized as infants. Baptism is part of the Rite of Christian Initiation of Adults, provided for converts from non-Christian backgrounds and others not baptized as infants. Baptism by non-Catholic Christians is valid if the formula and water are present, and so converts from other Christian denominations are not given a Catholic baptism.

The church recognizes two equivalents of baptism with water: "baptism of blood" and "baptism of desire". Baptism of blood is that undergone by unbaptized individuals who are martyred for their faith, while baptism of desire generally applies to catechumens who die before they can be baptized. The Catechism of the Catholic Church describes these two forms:

The Church has always held the firm conviction that those who suffer death for the sake of the faith without having received Baptism are baptized by their death for and with Christ. This Baptism of blood, like the desire for Baptism, brings about the fruits of Baptism without being a sacrament.
— 1258

For catechumens who die before their Baptism, their explicit desire to receive it, together with repentance for their sins, and charity, assures them the salvation that they were not able to receive through the sacrament.
— 1259

The Catholic Church holds that those who are ignorant of Christ's Gospel and of the church, but who seek the truth and do God's will as they understand it, may be supposed to have an implicit desire for baptism and can be saved: Since Christ died for all, and since all men are in fact called to one and the same destiny, which is divine, we must hold that the Holy Spirit offers to all the possibility of being made partakers, in a way known to God, of the Paschal mystery.' Every man who is ignorant of the Gospel of Christ and of his Church, but seeks the truth and does the will of God in accordance with his understanding of it, can be saved. It may be supposed that such persons would have desired Baptism explicitly if they had known its necessity." As for unbaptized infants, the church is unsure of their fate; "the Church can only entrust them to the mercy of God".

Eastern Orthodoxy

In Eastern Orthodoxy, baptism is considered a sacrament and mystery which transforms the old and sinful person into a new and pure one, where the old life, the sins, any mistakes made are gone and a clean slate is given. In Greek and Russian Orthodox traditions, it is taught that through Baptism a person is united to the Body of Christ by becoming an official member of the Orthodox Church. During the service, the Orthodox priest blesses the water to be used. The catechumen (the one baptised) is fully immersed in the water three times in the name of the Trinity. This is considered to be a death of the "old man" by participation in the crucifixion and burial of Christ, and a rebirth into new life in Christ by participation in his resurrection. Properly a new name is given, which becomes the person's name.

Babies of Orthodox families are normally baptized shortly after birth. Older converts to Orthodoxy are usually formally baptized into the Orthodox Church, though exceptions are sometimes made. Those who choose to convert from a different religion to Eastern Orthodoxy typically undergo Chrismation, known as conformation in the Roman Catholic Church.

Properly and generally, the Mystery of Baptism is administered by bishops and other priests; however, in emergencies any Orthodox Christian can baptize. In such cases, should the person survive the emergency, it is likely that the person will be properly baptized by a priest at some later date. This is not considered to be a second baptism, nor is it imagined that the person is not already Orthodox, but rather it is a fulfillment of the proper form.

The service of baptism in Greek Orthodox (and other Eastern Orthodox) churches has remained largely unchanged for over 1500 years. This fact is witnessed to by Cyril of Jerusalem (d. 386), who, in his Discourse on the Sacrament of Baptism, describes the service in much the same way as is currently in use.

Other groups

Jehovah's Witnesses
Jehovah's Witnesses believes that baptism should be performed by complete immersion (submersion) in water and only when an individual is old enough to understand its significance. They believe that water baptism is an outward symbol that a person has made an unconditional dedication through Jesus Christ to do the will of God. Only after baptism, is a person considered a full-fledged Witness, and an official member of the Christian Congregation. They consider baptism to constitute ordination as a minister.

Prospective candidates for baptism must express their desire to be baptized well in advance of a planned baptismal event, to allow for congregation elders to assess their suitability (regarding true repentance and conversion). Elders approve candidates for baptism if the candidates are considered to understand what is expected of members of the religion and to demonstrate sincere dedication to the faith.

Most baptisms among Jehovah's Witnesses are performed at scheduled assemblies and conventions by elders and ministerial servants, in special pools, or sometimes oceans, rivers, or lakes, depending on circumstances, and rarely occur at local Kingdom Halls. Prior to baptism, at the conclusion of a pre-baptism talk, candidates must affirm two questions:

Only baptized males (elders or ministerial servants) may baptize new members. Baptizers and candidates wear swimsuits or other informal clothing for baptism, but are directed to avoid clothing that is considered undignified or too revealing. Generally, candidates are individually immersed by a single baptizer, unless a candidate has special circumstances such as a physical disability. In circumstances of extended isolation, a qualified candidate's dedication and stated intention to become baptized may serve to identify him as a member of Jehovah's Witnesses, even if immersion itself must be delayed. In rare instances, unbaptized males who had stated such an intention have reciprocally baptized each other, with both baptisms accepted as valid. Individuals who had been baptized in the 1930s and 1940s by female Witnesses due to extenuating circumstances, such as in concentration camps, were later re-baptized but still recognized their original baptism dates.

Church of Jesus Christ of Latter-day Saints

In the Church of Jesus Christ of Latter-day Saints (LDS Church), baptism is recognized as the first of several ordinances (rituals) of the gospel. In Mormonism, baptism has the main purpose of remitting the sins of the participant. It is followed by confirmation, which inducts the person into membership in the church and constitutes a baptism with the Holy Spirit. Latter-day Saints believe that baptism must be by full immersion, and by a precise ritualized ordinance: if some part of the participant is not fully immersed, or the ordinance was not recited verbatim, the ritual must be repeated. It typically occurs in a baptismal font.

In addition, members of the LDS Church do not believe a baptism is valid unless it is performed by a Latter-day Saint one who has proper authority (a priest or elder). Authority is passed down through a form of apostolic succession. All new converts to the faith must be baptized or re-baptized. Baptism is seen as symbolic both of Jesus' death, burial and resurrection and is also symbolic of the baptized individual discarding their "natural" self and donning a new identity as a disciple of Jesus.

According to Latter-day Saint theology, faith and repentance are prerequisites to baptism. The ritual does not cleanse the participant of original sin, as Latter-day Saints do not believe the doctrine of original sin. Mormonism rejects infant baptism and baptism must occur after the age of accountability, defined in Latter-day Saint scripture as eight years old.

Latter-day Saint theology also teaches baptism for the dead in which deceased ancestors are baptized vicariously by the living, and believe that their practice is what Paul wrote of in Corinthians 15:29. This occurs in Latter-day Saint temples.

Non-practitioners

Quakers
Quakers (members of the Religious Society of Friends) do not believe in the baptism of either children or adults with water, rejecting all forms of outward sacraments in their religious life. Robert Barclay's Apology for the True Christian Divinity (a historic explanation of Quaker theology from the 17th century), explains Quakers' opposition to baptism with water thus:

Barclay argued that water baptism was only something that happened until the time of Christ, but that now, people are baptised inwardly by the spirit of Christ, and hence there is no need for the external sacrament of water baptism, which Quakers argue is meaningless.

Salvation Army
The Salvation Army does not practice water baptism, or indeed other outward sacraments. William Booth and Catherine Booth, the founders of the Salvation Army, believed that many Christians had come to rely on the outward signs of spiritual grace rather than on grace itself. They believed what was important was spiritual grace itself. However, although the Salvation Army does not practice baptism, they are not opposed to baptism within other Christian denominations.

Hyperdispensationalism

There are some Christians termed "Hyperdispensationalists" (Mid-Acts dispensationalism) who accept only Paul's Epistles as directly applicable for the church today. They do not accept water baptism as a practice for the church since Paul who was God's apostle to the nations was not sent to baptize. Ultradispensationalists (Acts 28 dispensationalism) who do not accept the practice of the Lord's supper, do not practice baptism because these are not found in the Prison Epistles. Both sects believe water baptism was a valid practice for covenant Israel. Hyperdispensationalists also teach that Peter's gospel message was not the same as Paul's. Hyperdispensationalists assert:
 The great commission and its baptism is directed to early Jewish believers, not the Gentile believers of mid-Acts or later.
 The baptism of Acts 2:36–38 is Peter's call for Israel to repent of complicity in the death of their Messiah; not as a Gospel announcement of atonement for sin, a later doctrine revealed by Paul.

Water baptism found early in the Book of Acts is, according to this view, now supplanted by the one baptism foretold by John the Baptist. Others make a distinction between John's prophesied baptism by Christ with the Holy Spirit and the Holy Spirit's baptism of the believer into the body of Christ; the latter being the one baptism for today. The one baptism for today, it is asserted, is the "baptism of the Holy Spirit" of the believer into the Body of Christ church.

Many in this group also argue that John's promised baptism by fire is pending, referring to the destruction of the world by fire.

Other Hyperdispensationalists believe that baptism was necessary until mid-Acts.

Debaptism

Most Christian churches see baptism as a once-in-a-lifetime event that can be neither repeated nor undone. They hold that those who have been baptized remain baptized, even if they renounce the Christian faith by adopting a non-Christian religion or by rejecting religion entirely. But some other organizations and individuals are practicing debaptism.

Comparative summary

Comparative Summary of Baptisms of Denominations of Christian Influence. (This section does not give a complete listing of denominations, and therefore, it only mentions a fraction of the churches practicing "believer's baptism".)

Other initiation ceremonies

Many cultures practice or have practiced initiation rites, with or without the use of water, including the ancient Egyptian, the Hebraic/Jewish, the Babylonian, the Mayan, and the Norse cultures. The modern Japanese practice of Miyamairi is such as ceremony that does not use water. In some, such evidence may be archaeological and descriptive in nature, rather than a modern practice.

Mystery religion initiation rites
Many scholars have drawn parallels between rites from mystery religions and baptism in Christianity. Apuleius, a 2nd-century Roman writer, described an initiation into the mysteries of Isis. The initiation was preceded by a normal bathing in the public baths and a ceremonial sprinkling by the priest of Isis, after which the candidate was given secret instructions in the temple of the goddess. The candidate then fasted for ten days from meat and wine, after which he was dressed in linen and led at night into the innermost part of the sanctuary, where the actual initiation, the details of which were secret, took place. On the next two days, dressed in the robes of his consecration, he participated in feasting. Apuleius describes also an initiation into the cult of Osiris and yet a third initiation, of the same pattern as the initiation into the cult of Isis, without mention of a preliminary bathing. The water-less initiations of Lucius, the character in Apuleius's story who had been turned into an ass and changed back by Isis into human form, into the successive degrees of the rites of the goddess was accomplished only after a significant period of study to demonstrate his loyalty and trustworthiness, akin to catechumenal practices preceding baptism in Christianity.

Jan Bremmer has written on the putative connection between rites from mystery religions and baptism:

There are thus some verbal parallels between early Christianity and the Mysteries, but the situation is rather different as regards early Christian ritual practice. Much ink was spilled around 1900 arguing that the rituals of baptism and of the Last Supper derived from the ancient Mysteries, but Nock and others after him have easily shown that these attempts grossly misinterpreted the sources. Baptism is clearly rooted in Jewish purificatory rituals, and cult meals are so widespread in antiquity that any specific derivation is arbitrary. It is truly surprising to see how long the attempts to find some pagan background to these two Christian sacraments have persevered. Secularising ideologies clearly played an important part in these interpretations but, nevertheless, they have helped to clarify the relations between nascent Christianity and its surroundings.

Thus the practice is derivative, whether from Judaism, the Mysteries or a combination (see the reference to Hellenistic Judaism in the Etymology section.)

Gnostic Catholicism and Thelema
The Ecclesia Gnostica Catholica, or Gnostic Catholic Church (the ecclesiastical arm of Ordo Templi Orientis), offers its Rite of Baptism to any person at least 11 years old.

Baptism of objects

The word "baptism" or "christening" is sometimes used to describe the inauguration of certain objects for use.

Boats and ships

Baptism of Ships: since at least the time of the Crusades, rituals have contained a blessing for ships. The priest begs God to bless the vessel and protect those who sail on it. The ship is usually sprinkled with holy water.

Church bells
The name Baptism of Bells has been given to the blessing of (musical, especially church) bells, at least in France, since the 11th century. It is derived from the washing of the bell with holy water by the bishop, before he anoints it with the oil of the infirm without and with chrism within; a fuming censer is placed under it and the bishop prays that these sacramentals of the church may, at the sound of the bell, put the demons to flight, protect from storms, and call the faithful to prayer.

Dolls
"Baptism of Dolls": the custom of 'dolly dunking' was once a common practice in parts of the United Kingdom, particularly in Cornwall where it has been revived in recent years.

Mandaean baptism

Mandaeans revere John the Baptist and practice frequent baptism (masbuta) as a ritual of purification, not of initiation. They are possibly the earliest people to practice baptism. Mandaeans undergo baptism on Sundays (Habshaba), wearing a white sacral robe (rasta). Baptism for Mandaeans consists of a triple full immersion in water, a triple signing of the forehead with water and a triple drinking of water. The priest (Rabbi) then removes a ring made of myrtle worn by the baptized and places it on their forehead. This is then followed by a handshake (kushta, "hand of truth") with the priest. The final blessing involves the priest laying his right hand on the baptized person's head. Living water (fresh, natural, flowing water) is a requirement for baptism, therefore can only take place in rivers. All rivers are named Jordan (yardena) and are believed to be nourished by the World of Light. By the river bank, a Mandaean's forehead is anointed with sesame oil (misha) and partakes in a communion of bread (pihta) and water. Baptism for Mandaeans allows for salvation by connecting with the World of Light and for forgiveness of sins.

Sethian baptism

The Sethian baptismal rite is known as the Five Seals, in which the initiate is immersed five times in running water.

Yazidi baptism

Yazidi baptism is called mor kirin (literally: "to seal"). Traditionally, Yazidi children are baptised at birth with water from the Kaniya Sipî ("White Spring") at Lalish. It essentially consists of pouring holy water from the spring on the child's head three times.

Islamic practice of wudu
Many Islamic scholars such as Shaikh Bawa Muhaiyaddeen have compared the Islamic practice of wudu to a baptism. Wudu is a practice that Muslims practice to go from ritual impurity to ritual purity. This is mandatory for a Muslim to do before each of the five daily prayers, as well as following sexual intercourse, using the restroom, and other acts.

Wudu, which is done at least five times a day, by practicing Muslims, results in the purification of a person and the removal of their sins.

In a famous hadith, the Prophet Muhammad says "Whenever a man performs his ablution intending to pray and he washes his hands, the sins of his hands fall down with the first drop. When he rinses his mouth and nose, the sins of his tongue and lips fall down with the first drop. When he washes his face, the sins of his hearing and sight fall down with the first drop. When he washes his arms to his elbows and his feet to his ankles, he is purified from every sin and fault like the day he was born from his mother. If he stands for prayer, Allah will raise his status by a degree. If he sits, he will sit in peace."

See also
 Amrit Sanchar, in Sikhism
 Baptism by fire
 Baptistery
 Chrism
 Christifideles
 Consolamentum
 Disciple (Christianity)
 Divine filiation
 Ghusl
 Holy water in Eastern Christianity
 Mikvah
 Misogi
 Prevenient Grace
 Ritual purification
 Theophany
 Water and religion

Notes

References

Further reading
 
 
 
 
 
 
 
 . 26 pp. N.B.: States the Evangelical Anglican position of the Reformed Episcopal Church.

External links

 "Writings of the Early Church Fathers on Baptism"
 "Baptism." Encyclopædia Britannica Online.
 
 

 
Christian terminology
Conversion to Christianity
Rites of passage
Ritual purity in Christianity
Sacraments
Mandaean rituals